Bani Amr s-Safl is a sub-district located in Al Qafr District, Ibb Governorate, Yemen. Bani Amr s-Safl had a population of  9384 as of 2004.

References 

Sub-districts in Al Qafr District